Buttercup Mountain is a peak in the Smoky Mountains of Idaho, United States. It is in the watersheds of Willow and Deer creeks. No roads or trails go to the summit.

References 

Mountains of Idaho
Mountains of Blaine County, Idaho
Mountains of Camas County, Idaho
Sawtooth National Forest